This is the alphabetical list of current and former Rajya Sabha members from all States.
Source: Parliament of India (Rajya Sabha)

The list is incomplete.

Abbreviations

States and Union Territories
 AP - Andhra Pradesh * AR - Arunachal Pradesh * AS - Assam * BR - Bihar * CT - Chhattisgarh * DL - Delhi * GA - Goa * GJ - Gujarat * HR - Haryana * HP - Himachal Pradesh * JK - Jammu and Kashmir * JH - Jharkhand * KA - Karnataka * KL - Kerala * MP - Madhya Pradesh* MH - Maharashtra * MN - Manipur * ML - Meghalaya * MZ - Mizoram  * NL - Nagaland * OR - Odisha * PB - Punjab * PY - Puducherry * RJ - Rajasthan * SK - Sikkim * TN - Tamil Nadu  * TG - Telangana  * TR - Tripura * UP - Uttar Pradesh * UT - Uttarakhand * WB - West Bengal

Party
 BJP - Bharatiya Janata Party * BSP - Bahujan Samaj Party * CPI - Communist Party Of India * CPM - Communist Party Of India (Marxist ) * INC - Indian National Congress * SP - Samajwadi Party *

A

B

C

D

E

F

G

H

I

J

K

L

M

N

O

P

Q

R

S

T

U

V

W

X

No member

Y

Z

References

 
Alphabetic lists